Richard Henrik Beamish (16 June 1861 – 23 February 1938) was an Irish politician, brewer and company director.

Early and personal life
He was born in Glounthaune, County Cork, the eldest child of Richard Pigott Beamish and his wife Hulda Elizabeth Constance. Educated at Haileybury, Beamish studied agriculture in Sweden (1881–1887).

He married Violet Campbell in October 1903. They had one son and two daughters. The family resided at Ashbourne, Glounthaune, County Cork, and in 1931 Beamish moved to England; first to Kensington, London, and later to Weybridge, Surrey. After his death, his estate in Ireland was worth £674.

Business
Beamish probably joined the Beamish and Crawford brewery shortly after his return to Ireland, and in 1899 he became the acting partner of the Beamish family. Beamish became chairman and managing director (1901–1930); during his stewardship the firm acquired the Dungarvan brewery (1906) and Allman, Dowden & Co., Bandon (1914), and entered a joint venture with John Walsh, MP, manufacturing aerated waters (1914).

Politics
He was active in Cork civic affairs as an alderman (Centre Ward) and as Chairman of the public works committee, he took a keen interest in the development of Cork port, and represented Cork corporation at the first International Congress of Cities, Town Planning, and Housing at Ghent, Belgium in 1913.

A prominent unionist before 1922, he visited Downing Street on 4 August 1920 as part of a deputation and told David Lloyd George that dominion status for Ireland was the only alternative to anarchy. In May 1922 he, Darrell Figgis, and Maurice George Moore met with the Irish Farmers' Union to see what action farmers would take regarding the nomination of independent candidates at the general election. This was seen by Éamon de Valera as an attempt to break up his election pact with Michael Collins.

He was an unsuccessful candidate at the 1922 general election but he was elected to Dáil Éireann as an Teachta Dála (TD) for the Cork Borough constituency at the 1923 general election. He was elected under the label of Cork Progressive Association, a group associated with the Business and Professional Group. He did not contest the June 1927 general election.

Though largely supporting the Cumann na nGaedheal government, he rarely spoke in the Dáil. Bills with which he concerned himself included those on the courts of justice, intoxicating liquor, and local government (1923–1925). He advocated a central road board responsible for all road construction in the state; was highly critical of the low standard of education in the agricultural colleges; and, as a member of the Dáil committee on wireless broadcasting (1924), totally opposed any project involving public expenditure on broadcasting as a medium of entertainment.

In 1924, he spoke against the conduct of the Cork Corporation during a public inquiry, held in the Cork Courthouse. He was supported by the Cork Progressive Association, who had successfully lobbied the government to instigate the inquiry. He was critical of then Lord Mayor, Seán French, who was present at the inquiry. He was a  critic of the city council, seeing it dissolved in 1923; though elected to the reconstituted council (June 1930), he did not attend any meetings from December 1931 onwards.

He was Sheriff of Cork City in 1907 and 1911. The Richard Beamish Cricket Grounds (more commonly known as The Mardyke) is named after him.

References

1861 births
1938 deaths
Independent TDs
Members of the 4th Dáil
Politicians from County Cork
Business and Professional Group TDs
People educated at Haileybury and Imperial Service College